Kevin Arthur James (born 9 December 1987) is a Dominican cricketer who has played for the Windward Islands in West Indian domestic cricket. He is an all-rounder who bowls right-arm medium pace and bats left-handed.

James appeared for Dominica at the 2008 Stanford 20/20, playing against the British Virgin Islands and Barbados. He made his senior debut for the Windwards in the 2008–09 WICB Cup, a limited-overs competition, and his first-class debut during the 2008–09 Regional Four Day Competition, Against Jamaica in the latter, James scored his only first-class half-century to date, 55 runs from fourth in the batting order. His most recent matches for the Windwards came in the 2010–11 Regional Four Day Competition.

References

External links
Player profile and statistics at CricketArchive
Player profile and statistics at ESPNcricinfo

1987 births
Living people
Dominica cricketers
Windward Islands cricketers
People from Saint George Parish, Dominica